William Eugene Davis (born August 18, 1936), known as W. Eugene Davis, is a senior United States circuit judge of the United States Court of Appeals for the Fifth Circuit. His chambers are in New Orleans, Louisiana.

Education

Born in Winfield in Marion County in northwestern Alabama, Davis attended Samford University in Homewood, a suburb of Birmingham, Alabama. After three years at Samford, he received a scholarship to Tulane University Law School in New Orleans. There he received his Juris Doctor in 1960 without having received an undergraduate degree (Samford awarded him a Bachelor of Arts degree in 2006). While at Tulane, Davis was a member of the Board of Editors of the Tulane Law Review and graduated Order of the Coif.

Career

Davis was in private practice in New Orleans from 1960 to 1964, and then joined a law firm in New Iberia, where his partners were Congressman Pat Caffery and U.S. Circuit Judge John Malcolm Duhé, Jr.

Federal judicial service

On August 5, 1976, Davis was nominated by President Gerald Ford, to a seat on the United States District Court for the Western District of Louisiana vacated by Judge Richard Johnson Putnam. Davis was confirmed by the United States Senate on September 17, 1976, and received his commission on September 21, 1976. His service terminated on December 9, 1983, due to elevation to the Fifth Circuit.

President Ronald Reagan nominated Davis to the United States Court of Appeals for the Fifth Circuit on November 1, 1983, to a seat vacated by Judge Robert A. Ainsworth Jr., who died on December 22, 1981. Reagan at first considered Ben Toledano, a New Orleans lawyer and former Republican political candidate for the slot but withdrew the nomination after opposition surfaced from the NAACP. Davis was again confirmed by the United States Senate on November 15, 1983, and received his commission the following day. He assumed senior status on December 31, 2016.

Judge Davis was appointed by Chief Justice William Rehnquist as a member of the Advisory Committee on the Federal Rules of Criminal Procedure on October 1, 1995. Davis became Chairman of this Committee on October 1, 1997 and served as Chairman until October 2001 when his term of service ended.

In 2014, Judge Davis received the prestigious American Inns of Court Professionalism Award for the Fifth Circuit at the American Inns of Court Celebration of Excellence held at the Supreme Court of the United States. Judge Davis was inducted into the Tulane Law School Hall of Fame in March 2015. In 2017, the Louisiana Bar Foundation awarded Davis its Distinguished Jurist Award.

Notable case

Davis was one of three judges on a panel that heard the appeal to Hornbeck Offshore Services LLC v. Salazar, a case challenging the U.S. Department of the Interior six-month moratorium on exploratory drilling in deep water that was adopted in the wake of the Deepwater Horizon explosion and the subsequent oil spill. The Fifth Circuit panel denied the government's emergency request to stay the lower court's decision pending appeal.

References

External links
 
  Gracella Simmons, "Ten questions with Judge W. Eugene Davis", Baton Rouge Bar Association, Oct. 1, 2006

1936 births
20th-century American judges
Judges of the United States Court of Appeals for the Fifth Circuit
Judges of the United States District Court for the Western District of Louisiana
Living people
Louisiana Republicans
People from Lafayette, Louisiana
People from Marion County, Alabama
People from New Iberia, Louisiana
Samford University alumni
Tulane University Law School alumni
United States court of appeals judges appointed by Ronald Reagan
United States district court judges appointed by Gerald Ford